Aryl-hydrocarbon-interacting protein-like 1 is a protein that in humans is encoded by the AIPL1 gene.

Function 

Leber congenital amaurosis (LCA) accounts for at least 5% of all inherited retinal disease and is the most severe inherited retinopathy with the earliest age of onset. Individuals affected with LCA are diagnosed at birth or in the first few months of life with severely impaired vision or blindness, nystagmus and an abnormal or flat electroretinogram. The photoreceptor/pineal -expressed gene, AIPL1, encoding aryl-hydrocarbon interacting protein-like 1, was mapped within the LCA4 candidate region. The protein contains three tetratricopeptide motifs, consistent with nuclear transport or chaperone activity. AIPL1 mutations may cause approximately 20% of recessive LCA.

Interactions 

AIPL1 has been shown to interact with NUB1.

References

Further reading

External links 
 
  GeneReviews/NCBI/NIH/UW entry on Retinitis Pigmentosa Overview